Kneippbrød ("Kneippbread") is a whole wheat bread. It is named for Sebastian Kneipp (1821–1897),  a 19th-century Bavarian priest and hydrotherapist. It is the most popular bread in Norway.

History
The publisher Søren Mittet first brought Dr. Kneipp's recipe to Norway, where the bakery  Baker Hansen AS  officially licensed it in 1895. The recipe and name were quickly copied. The official Oslo breakfast (Oslofrokosten) first prepared for Norwegian schools in 1929 employed a coarse form of the bread. According to FEDIMA, as of 2006, more than 60 million loaves were consumed annually.

See also

 Sebastian Kneipp

References

Norwegian breads
Whole wheat breads